Johnston Building was a historic wholesale building located at Baltimore, Maryland, United States designed by Jackson C. Gott. It is a five-story loft building constructed in 1880.  The cast iron façade reflected the influence of the Queen Anne style.  It housed wholesale companies dealing in tobacco, hats, shoes, clothing, and home and office furnishings, including Samuel Hecht, Jr. & Sons. It was demolished in 2002.

Johnston Building was listed on the National Register of Historic Places in 1994.

References

External links
, including photo from 1989, at Maryland Historical Trust

Cast-iron architecture in Baltimore
Commercial buildings on the National Register of Historic Places in Baltimore
Downtown Baltimore
Historic American Buildings Survey in Baltimore
Commercial buildings completed in 1880
1880 establishments in Maryland
Buildings and structures demolished in 2002
Demolished buildings and structures in Baltimore